U Andromedae is a variable star in the constellation of Andromeda, at a distance of approximately . It is a star of spectral type M6e and it is classified as a Mira variable.

U Andromedae is the variable star designation of this star. Similarly, the magnitude of each maximum and minimum varies. The mean apparent magnitude is 11.6, with a mean maximum magnitude of 9.9. The brightest recorded maxima are at magnitude 9.0, and the faintest minima at magnitude 15.0. The rise to maximum  brightness is faster than the fall to minimum, taking on average 40% of the period.

The large amplitude, long period, and shape of the light curve mean that U Andromedae is classified as a Mira variable, a type of pulsating asymptotic giant branch (AGB) star.  It was first observed to be variable by Thomas D. Anderson during 1894 and 1895.  AGB stars have exhausted both hydrogen and helium in their cores and are not massive enough to fuse carbon and oxygen, so they erratically fuse helium and hydrogen shells outside the core.

References

Mira variables
Andromeda (constellation)
007482
M-type giants
Andromedae, U
Durchmusterung objects
Emission-line stars
J01152971+4043082
IRAS catalogue objects